Ana Singh is an Indian fashion designer, mainly working for the Indian movie industry Bollywood. She has designed costumes for more than 900 films and has been working since 1989. In 2002 she was the first fashion designer to introduce actress Katrina Kaif in her show as a model. In 2010, she designed the clothes for the actors who participated in the opening ceremony of the Commonwealth Games in India.

Costume designer
 Veer (2010)
 Yuvvraaj (2008) As Ana Singh
 Dhoom 2 (2006) 
 Vivah (2006)
 Golmaal: Fun Unlimited (2006)
 Anjaane: The Unknown (2006)
 Taj Mahal: An Eternal Love Story (2005)
 Dil Jo Bhi Kahey (2005)
 Main Aisa Hi Hoon (2005)
 Blackmail (2005)
 Hulchul (2004)
 Masti (2004)
 Khakee (2004)
 Boom   (2003)
 Akhiyon Se Goli Maare (2002)
 Shararat (2002)
 Awara Paagal Deewana (2002)
 Aankhen (2002) 
 Ajnabee (2001)
 Lajja (2001)
 Yaadein (2001)
 Ittefaq (2001)
 Dhaai Akshar Prem Ke (2000)
 Tera Jadoo Chal Gayaa (2000)
 Tarkieb (2000)
 Joru Ka Ghulam (2000)
 Khauff (2000)
 Khoobsurat (1999)
 Hote Hote Pyar Ho Gaya (1999)
 Aarzoo (1999)
 Laawaris (1999)
 Aa Ab Laut Chalen (1999)
 Soldier (1998)
 Ghulam (1998)
 Koyla (1998)

References

External links
 

Indian women fashion designers
Indian costume designers
Living people
Year of birth missing (living people)
20th-century Indian designers
21st-century Indian designers
Artists from Mumbai
Women artists from Maharashtra
Best Costume Design National Film Award winners
20th-century Indian women